Genevieve Dolores Gerber (April 3, 1894 – January 2, 1974) was an American silent film actress who appeared in more than 120 films between 1912 and 1930.

Early life and career
She was born in Argenta, Illinois, to S. Nelson Gerber (1870–1902) and Juanetta Jean Pullman. Her parents separated when she was young and her mother moved her to Los Angeles, California. She was raised by nuns from the College of the Immaculate Heart. After the death of her father, Gerber's impoverished mother gave guardianship of her daughter to an attorney.

After her graduation from high school, Gerber became an actress and appeared in several one-reelers. Her film debut came in The Flower Girl's Romance (1912). Beginning in 1917, she starred in multiple serial films, and she is considered one of the top ten "serial queens" of the silent film period. She teamed with director and actor Ben F. Wilson in many of these productions, and starred in the first crude sound era serial, The Voice from the Sky, also directed by Wilson. However, her career stalled in 1930 after Wilson died from heart disease. Gerber retired from acting shortly thereafter.

Personal life and death
Gerber's first marriage was to actor Arthur Nelson Millett on July 22, 1913. They separated the following year. In 1915, she became engaged to director William Desmond Taylor. Gerber and Taylor did not marry, because she was not yet divorced from Millett, and she and Taylor broke it off in 1919. (Taylor was subsequently murdered in 1922, a famous unsolved case). Gerber's divorce from Millett was eventually finalized in 1920. In 1923, Gerber married contractor Edward Dana Nolan, who died in 1926 of alcoholism. She went on to marry David Booth in 1934. After Booth's death, she married a fourth and final time, to contractor William Munchoff; he died in 1960.

On January 2, 1974, Gerber died of a cerebral thrombosis in Palm Springs, California. She was buried in a pauper's grave in Desert Memorial Park in Cathedral City, California.

Selected filmography

References

External links

1894 births
1974 deaths
20th-century American actresses
Actresses from Illinois
American film actresses
American silent film actresses
Burials at Desert Memorial Park
Neurological disease deaths in California
Deaths from cerebral thrombosis
Film serial actresses
People from Macon County, Illinois
Vaudeville performers
Western (genre) film actresses